Mirza Saeed Khan Ansari or simply Sa'id Mo'tamen ol-Molk (1816 in Meyaneh(Ishlaq) – 1884 in Tehran) was the prime minister of Iran (Persia) during the Qajar dynasty under king Naser od-Din Shah Qajar between 1853 and 1873. He is probably best known as a signatory of the 1881 Akhal Treaty.

References

1816 births
1884 deaths
Prime Ministers of Iran
19th-century Iranian politicians
Foreign ministers of Iran
People of Qajar Iran